University of Poonch is a public university located in Rawalakot, Azad Kashmir, Pakistan. The university has 3 different campuses: The Main campus in Rawalakot, the Kahuta campus, and the Mong campus. , the university has 7 faculties consisting of 26 departments.

Faculties 

The university has seven faculties comprising 26 departments:

Faculty of Agriculture:

Departments: Food science & Technology, Agricultural economics, Horticulture, Entomology, Agronomy, Plant pathology, Plant breeding & Molecular genetics, and Soil & Environmental sciences.

Faculty of Medical & Health sciences:

Departments: Pharmacy, and Eastern medicine & Surgery.

Faculty of Management sciences:

Departments: Business administration, and Commerce.

Faculty of Basic & Applied sciences:

Departments: Computer sciences, Chemistry, Physics, Zoology, Mathematics, Botany, and Earth sciences.

Faculty of Humanities and Social sciences:

Departments: Economics, English, Sociology, Psychology, and Islamic studies.

Faculty of Engineering & Technology:

Departments: Electrical engineering.

Faculty of Veterinary & Animal sciences:

Departments: Veterinary & Animal sciences.

Affiliation 

The university of Poonch is affiliated with the Pakistan Veterinary Medical Council.

Recognition 

In addition to its affiliate, the university is also recognized by institutions including the Higher Education Commission of Pakistan, the Pharmacy Council of Pakistan, and the National Council for Tibb.

References

External links 
 

Public universities and colleges in Pakistan